Chase Minnaar (born 15 July 1986) is a former South African rugby union player, who played with  in the Currie Cup and Vodacom Cup. His usual position is flanker.

He was also a regular in the South Africa Sevens team.

References

Living people
1986 births
South African rugby union players
Griquas (rugby union) players
South Africa international rugby sevens players
Alumni of St. Andrew's College, Grahamstown
Rugby sevens players at the 2010 Commonwealth Games
Commonwealth Games bronze medallists for South Africa
Commonwealth Games rugby sevens players of South Africa
Commonwealth Games medallists in rugby sevens
Rugby union flankers
Medallists at the 2010 Commonwealth Games